Paul Mifka (born 6 August 1965) is a former Australian rules footballer who played for West Perth in the West Australian Football League (WAFL) and the West Coast Eagles in the Australian Football League (AFL).

Playing career
Mifka was used initially as a wingman at West Perth but developed into a defender.

He joined West Coast in 1987 for their inaugural season but had to wait until the last home and away match to make his debut. He was picked up by the Brisbane Bears in 1990 AFL draft but it wasn't successful and he ended up back at West Perth.

A dual WAFL premiership player, in 1995 and 1999, Mifka won West Perth's Breckler Medal in 1993. He was also a four-time interstate representative and played State of Origin football in the 1988 Adelaide Bicentennial Carnival.

References

Holmesby, Russell and Main, Jim (2007). The Encyclopedia of AFL Footballers. 7th ed. Melbourne: Bas Publishing.

External links

1965 births
Living people
Australian rules footballers from Western Australia
West Perth Football Club players
West Coast Eagles players
Western Australian State of Origin players